The following is a list of the 50 most populous incorporated cities in the U.S. state of Ohio. The population is according to the 2018 census estimates from the United States Census Bureau.

References 

Municipalities